Izzat al-Nuss (1912–1976) was a Syrian politician who became the President and Prime Minister of Syria from 20 November to 14 December 1961.

Biography
Born in Damascus, al-Nuss studied literature at the University of Paris, then he returned to Syria and held several positions in the Ministry of Education. He later served as a secretary to President Hashim al-Atassi from March to September 1955, then worked in the University of Damascus until 1961, when Maamun al-Kuzbari appointed him as Minister of Education and later in charge of the provisional government during the parliamentary elections. He was also the interim Minister of Defense and Minister of Foreign Affairs and Expatriates until 22 December 1961.

He died in 1976 in Damascus, aged 64.

References

1912 births
1976 deaths
People from Damascus
Academic staff of Damascus University
Presidents of Syria
Prime Ministers of Syria
Syrian ministers of education
Foreign ministers of Syria
Syrian ministers of defense
Syrian Sunni Muslims
University of Paris alumni
20th-century Syrian politicians